Alliance Alice M. Baxter College-Ready High School is a public charter school located in San Pedro, California.

School description
Baxter High School is a member of Alliance College-Ready Public Schools, the largest charter organization in the Los Angeles area. It offers a college-preparatory curriculum through a unique instructional model called P.A.C.E. (Personalized Alliance College Experience).

Alice M. Baxter
The school was named for Alice Mary Byrne Baxter, the mother of philanthropist and diplomat, Frank E. Baxter. Alice Baxter (born in 1909) was largely self-educated, until she graduated from high school alongside her youngest daughter at the age of 58. She serves as a symbol of determination and persistence to the school community.

History
Baxter High School was founded in August 2014 under the leadership of its founding principal, Robert Canosa-Carr.

During its brief history, the school has attracted national and international attention for its innovative approach to learning:
 In September, 2014, the school hosted a public forum on public education reform, which included US Senator Rand Paul as a panelist and Congresswoman Janice Hahn as a guest speaker.
 In February, 2015, venture capitalist Brett Brewer (known for creating MySpace) visited the school to deliver a guest lecture to BHS students on the topic of entrepreneurialism.
 In January, 2016, Baxter High School hosted a delegation of educators from Beijing, China, which visited the school to learn about Baxter's "blended" approach to educational technology.
In August, 2017, Bobby Carr stepped down as Baxter High School principal to work for Summit Learning. Brandy Woodard, a former principal from Chicago, took over. 
 In June, 2018, Baxter High School held its first ever graduation at the Warner Grand in San Pedro, CA.

Awards and recognitions 
 Recognized by President Obama in a White House press release about "next generation" high schools.
 Received a "Next Generation Learning Challenge" grant, which identified Baxter High School's "PACE" program as a "breakthrough model for college readiness."

The Kraken
The school's mascot is the Kraken, a mythological sea monster. Former Principal, Bobby Car chose this mascot because Krakens ate Pirates in reference to San Pedro High School, whose mascot is a Pirate.

Athletics 
Baxter High School is an associate member of the Los Angeles City Section of the California Interscholastic Federation (CIF). The school offers the following programs: Cross Country, Soccer, Volleyball, Basketball, and Track & Field.

Citations 
http://www.baxterhigh.org/
https://web.archive.org/web/20160401210724/http://www.laalliance.org/schools/baxter/
http://www.greatschools.org/california/san-pedro/31028-Alliance-Alice-M.-Baxter-College-Ready-High-School-Will-Open-Fall-2014/
http://www.cde.ca.gov/re/sd/details.asp?cds=19647330127217&public=Y
http://www.maxpreps.com/local/school/home.aspx?schoolid=2034bbed-284f-4407-95d7-2b08c3d9d7e2
http://www.sanpedrobeacon.com/2014/06/11/baxter-high-school-to-open-this-august/
https://web.archive.org/web/20160422134601/http://www.sanpedrochamber.com/members/member-details.asp?id=Alliance%20Alice%20M.%20Baxter%20High%20School
https://www.youtube.com/watch?v=WqWob7K_Ggs
https://library.educause.edu/resources/2015/1/alliance-collegeready-public-schools-alice-m-baxter-collegeready-high-school

References

2014 establishments in California
Educational institutions established in 2014
Schools in Los Angeles